Na Mon is a district (amphoe) in the eastern part of Kalasin province, northeastern Thailand.

Geography
Neighboring districts are (from the northeast clockwise): Huai Phueng, Kuchinarai, Don Chan, Mueang Kalasin, and Somdet of Kalasin Province.

History
The minor district (king amphoe) Na Mon was created on 20 September 1973, when the three tambons Na Mon, Yot Kaeng, and Song Plueai were split off from Mueang Kalasin district. It was upgraded to a full district on 1 January 1988.

Administration
The district is divided into five sub-districts (tambons), which are further subdivided into 66 villages (mubans). Na Mon is a township (thesaban tambon) which covers parts of the tambon Na Mon. There are a further five tambon administrative organizations (TAO).

References

External links
amphoe.com

Na Mon